"Dance Mephisto" is a song by Falco from his 1992 studio album Nachtflug. It was also released as a single.

Background and writing 
The song was written by Rob and Ferdi Bolland (music) and Falco (lyrics).

The recording was produced by Rob and Ferdi Bolland.

Commercial performance 
The song reached no. 17 in Austria.

Track listings 
7" single Electrola 86 2023 7 (1992, Germany)
 A. "Dance Mephisto" (3:28)
 B. "Dance Mephisto" (Instrumental Radio Mix) (3:28)

CD single EMI 620 232 1 (1992)
 "Dance Mephisto" (Radio Mix) (3:28)
 "Dance Mephisto" (Dance Mix) (3:32)

Charts

References

External links 

 Falco – "Dance Mephisto" at Discogs

1992 songs
1992 singles
Falco (musician) songs
Electrola singles
EMI Records singles
Songs written by Falco (musician)
Songs written by Rob Bolland
Songs written by Ferdi Bolland